Rail First Asset Management (RailFirst), formerly known as CFCL Australia (CFCLA), is an Australian rolling stock leasing company operating in the rail freight market. It leases assets to a number of private rail operators in the local rail industry, predominantly on the defined interstate rail network.

Though primarily based in New South Wales, RailFirst's assets can be found operating in most Australian states and with all major train operating companies. It has rolling stock on both long-term lease to these companies as well as assets that are available for spot hire. It is owned by DIF Capital Partners and Amber Infrastructure.

History

CFCL Australia was established in 1998, by the American Chicago Freight Car Leasing Company. Its first contract was for the supply of a small fleet of radio controlled, automated ballast hoppers to Westrail.

The first locomotives acquired were 13 members of the EL class from Australian National in November 1998. In 2000, it diversified into wagons.

In March 2009, the Marubeni Corporation purchased a 49% stake in CFCL Australia. In November 2012, CFCL Australia unveiled its first infrastructure train in the Pilbara region of Western Australia. As at October 2014, it had locomotives operating construction trains on the Roy Hill railway and on the Hamersley & Robe River railway.

Marubeni relinquished its stake in CFCL Australia in 2016 and moving to 15% stake in CF Asia Pacific. As of January 2020, Marubeni holds no interest in either entity.

After being sold to Anchorage Capital Partners in January 2020, CFCL Australia was re-branded as Rail First Asset Management in 2021.

CFCLA Maintenance previously CF Rail Services

In September 2010, CFCLA took out a lease on the Goulburn Railway Workshops to maintain both its locomotive and wagon fleets with the facility named the Australian Horse Power Service Centre. As well as maintaining its own fleet, Chicago Freight Car Leasing Australia also perform maintenance for other operators including Qube Logistics. It also maintains locomotives at Islington Railway Workshops in Adelaide.

CF Rail Services was established in 2013, bringing together the Australian Horse Power Service Centre and took over Bluebird Rail Operations engineering business at Islington. The CF Rail Services name was dropped in 2017 to consolidate the name as Chicago Freight Car Leasing Australia also known as CFCLA.

Fleet
Initially, RailFirst locomotive fleet comprised second-hand locomotives no longer required by rail operators or re-manufactured units that had been given life-extending overhauls. More recently it has purchased new locomotives

The RailFirst diesel locomotive fleet is made up of a variety of different classes of units, ranging from modern high power units to older mainline locomotives, it's older smaller locomotive now retired. As at October 2019, it comprised 78 locomotives.

Most locomotives in the fleet are named after famous Australian racehorses.

RailFirst fleet consist of 1195 freight wagons of a variety of types including ballast hoppers, grain hoppers, bulk mineral hoppers, and intermodal flat wagons of varying lengths and carrying capabilities. RailFirst wagons generally have four-character identification codes starting with the letter C.

References

External links
Company website

Railway rolling stock leasing companies of Australia
Railway companies established in 1998
1998 establishments in Australia